Qandariyah is a Turkmen village in northern Aleppo Governorate, northern Syria.

With 888 inhabitants, as per the 2004 census, Qandariyah administratively belongs to Nahiya Jarabulus within Jarabulus District. Nearby localities include Ghassaniyah  to the west, al-Bir Fawqani  to the north, and Yusuf Bayk  to the east.

References

Populated places in Jarabulus District
Turkmen communities in Syria